Island Lakes is a neighbourhood of Winnipeg, Manitoba, Canada, located in the ward of St. Boniface at the southeast corner of the city. 

Developed by Novamet Development Corporation, the neighbourhood is set up in a curvilinear style typical of new suburbs. It is bordered by Bishop Grandin Boulevard to the north, Perimeter Highway to the south, Lagimodiere Boulevard to the east, and the CPR Emerson railway tracks to the west. 

As of the 2016 Census, the population of Island Lakes is 7,525.

History 
Construction began on the neighbourhood in 1981 and by 1985, 150 homes were built. Between 1986 and 1990, construction accelerated and an additional 880 homes were built.

References

Neighbourhoods in Winnipeg

Saint Boniface, Winnipeg